Lemuel Barnett Shirley (1916–1999) was the fourth bishop of Panama.  At the time Shirley was bishop, Panama was a diocese in Province 9 of the Episcopal Church in the United States of America.  Panama is now part  of the Anglican Church in Central America.

References

Bishops of the Episcopal Church (United States)
1916 births
1999 deaths
20th-century American Episcopalians
Anglican bishops of Panama
20th-century American clergy